Chadalavada Kutumba Rao, popularly known as Chadalavada (died 1968), was a Tollywood actor well known for his comedian roles. He appeared in many Telugu films. The prominent among them are: Aada Paduchu, Appu Chesi Pappu Koodu, Bharya Bharthalu, Jayabheri, Krishna Leelalu (1959), Maya Bazaar, Palletooru, Parivartana, Pelli Naati Pramanalu, Sri Krishnarjuna Yudham (1963), Thirupathamma Katha (1963) and Thodi Kodallu.

He started acting in dramas initially. He entered the Telugu cinema field in 1951. He had a familiar accent and was also a jovial personality.

He died in 1968.

Filmography
 Tahsildar (1944)
 Swargaseema (1945)
 Mana Desam  (1949) as Madhu
Pelli Chesi Choodu (1952)
 Palletooru (1952) (actor and playback singer)
 Pitchi Pullaiah (1953)
Vayyari Bhama (1953)
 Parivartana  (1954) as Pichi vaadu
 Nirupedalu (1954)
 Peddamanushulu (1954) as Seshavataram
Annadata (1954)
 Kanyasulkam (1955) as Polisetti
 Santhanam (1955)
 Ardhangi (1955)
 Santosham (1955) as Avatharam
 Charana Daasi (1956) as Hanumanthu
Sonta Ooru (1956)
Todi Kodallu  (1957) as Tirupatayya
 Maya Bazaar (1957) as Lambu
Sankalpam (1957) as Lakshmaiah
Aada Pettanam (1958)
Dongalunnaru Jagratha (1958)
Anna Thammudu (1958) as Brahmandam
Sri Krishna Maya (1958)
 Pelli Naati Pramanalu (1958)
 Appu Chesi Pappu Koodu (1958) as Chenchaiah
Atha Okinti Kodale (1958)
 Jayabheri  (1959) as Dappula Raghavulu
Pelli Sandadi (1959)
 Krishna Leelalu (1959)
 Banda Ramudu (1959)
Bala Nagamma (1959)
 Kuladaivam (1960)
Maa Babu (1960) as Ramu
 Nammina Bantu (1960)
 Bharya Bharthalu (1961)
Taxi Ramudu (1961)
 Chitti Tammudu (1962)
Siri Sampadalu (1962) as Anjaiah
Savati Koduku (1963)
Eedu Jodu (1963)
Sri Tirupatamma Katha (1963)
 Sri Krishnarjuna Yudham (1963) as Manchi Budhi
Marmayogi (1964) as Bairagi
Aathma Balam (1964) as Anand's father
Aastiparulu (1966) as Miriyala Parathpara Rao
 Navarathri (1966)
Dr. Anand (1966)
Kanchu Kota (1967)
Prana Mithrulu (1967)
Bhama Vijayam (1967)
Aada Paduchu (1967) as Sukhalu
 Lakshmi Nivasam (1968)

References

External links

20th-century Indian male actors
1968 deaths
Year of birth missing
Indian male film actors
Indian male comedians
Telugu male actors
Male actors in Telugu cinema